Michael Petkau Falk, better known as Touching (born 1979), is a singer-songwriter and producer.

Biography
Born in Winnipeg in 1979, Falk attended Canadian Mennonite University. Until 2011, he served as an artistic director for the West End Cultural Centre. Falk was part of record band, Les Jupes, until 2015 and released an album, Some Kind of Family.

In 2015, he was nominated for the Western Canadian Music Award.

In 2016, he worked as an artistic director for the Winnipeg International Jazz Festival.

In 2020, he started to use name, Touching.

In 2021, he released albums, Isolation Blues and littleworlds.

Discography

Albums
Some Kind of Family
Isolation Blues
Littleworlds

Singles
"Oh General"
"The Darkness"
"Let Me Be Lonely With You"

Awards and recognition
 2015: Western Canadian Music Award

References

1979 births
21st-century Canadian singers
Living people
Canadian male singer-songwriters